Megan J. Smith (born October 21, 1964) is an American engineer and technologist. She was the third Chief Technology Officer of the United States (U.S. CTO) and Assistant to the President, serving under President Barack Obama. She was previously a vice president at Google, leading new business development and early-stage partnerships across Google's global engineering and product teams at Google for nine years, was general manager of Google.org, a vice president briefly at Google[x] where she co-created WomenTechmakers, is the former CEO of Planet Out and worked as an engineer on early smartphones at General Magic. She serves on the boards of MIT and Vital Voices, was a member of the USAID Advisory Committee on Voluntary Aid and co-founded the Malala Fund. Today Smith is the CEO and Founder of shift7. On September 4, 2014, she was named as the third (and first female) U.S. CTO, succeeding Todd Park, and serving until January, 2017.

Early life and education
Smith grew up in Buffalo, New York, and Fort Erie, Ontario, and spent many summers at the Chautauqua Institution in Chautauqua, New York, where her mother, Joan Aspell Smith, was director of the Chautauqua Children's School. Smith graduated from City Honors School in 1982. She went on to receive her S.B. in 1986 and an S.M. in 1988, both in mechanical engineering, from Massachusetts Institute of Technology, and completed her Master's thesis work at the MIT Media Lab. She was a member of the MIT student team that designed, built and raced a solar car 2000 miles across the Australian outback in the first cross-continental solar car race.

Career
Following MIT, Smith worked at a variety of start-ups, including Apple in Tokyo and General Magic located in Mountain View, California, as product design lead on nascent smartphone technologies before she got involved with the launch of Planet Out in 1995. She joined formally in 1996 as COO and from 1998 she was Planet Out's Chief Executive Officer, where she expanded partnerships, built new business models, grew revenue and global users, raised venture funding, and later presided over that company's merger with Gay.com.

In 2003, she joined Google, where she rose to the vice president of new business development, leading early-stage partnerships, pilot explorations and technology licensing across Google's global engineering and product teams. She led many early acquisitions, including Keyhole (Google Earth), Where2Tech (Google Maps), and Picasa, and later also took over as general manager of Google's philanthropic arm, Google.org. Smith co-created and co-hosted Google's Solve for X solution acceleration programs 2012-14. In 2012, she started Google's "Women Techmakers" diversity initiative to expand visibility, community and resources for technical women globally.

In 2014, she left Google to become the 3rd U.S. CTO. In that role, Smith recruited top tech talent to serve across government collaborating on pressing issues, from AI, data science and open source, to inclusive economic growth, entrepreneurship, structural inequalities, government tech innovation capacity, STEM/STEAM engagement, workforce development, and criminal justice reform. Her teams focused on broad capacity building by co-creating all-hands-on-deck initiatives, including the public-private program TechHire, the Computer Science for All initiative, and the Image of STEM campaigns. In addition, she launched the campaign to #FindtheSentiments, which is an effort to find the Declaration of Sentiments, a piece of history from the Seneca Falls Convention. After leaving the White House in 2017, Smith became CEO and Founder of shift7 which works on tech-forward, inclusive innovation for faster impact on systemic economic, social, and environmental challenges. At shift7, the team continued co-creating the United Nations Solutions Summit and other programs; in 2017 Smith helped launch Tech Jobs Tour, aimed at promoting diversity in the technological sector, traveling to over 20 U.S. cities to help empower and connect local talent to their nascent tech sectors. Smith serves on the board of MIT, Vital Voices, LA2028, Think of Us as well as on the advisory boards for the MIT Media Lab and the Algorithmic Justice League. She is also a member of the Award Selection Committee for the distinguished Carroll L. Wilson Award at MIT.  Smith has contributed to a broad range of engineering projects, including a bicycle lock, space station construction program, and solar cookstoves.

She is an active proponent of STEM education and innovation.

Her appeal for technologists to work in public service at the annual Grace Hopper Celebration of Women in Computing inspired several Harvard University students to create the national non-profit organization Coding it Forward which creates data science and technology internship program for undergraduate and graduate students in United States federal agencies.

Smith was elected a member of the National Academy of Engineering in 2017 for leading technological innovation teams and efforts to increase diversity and inclusion in STEM industries both nationally and globally, and elected a member of the Council on Foreign Relations in 2018.

Recognition
 World Economic Forum Technology Pioneer 2001, 2002
 Listed by Out magazine in 2012 and 2013, as one of the 50 most powerful LGBT people in the United States
 Reuters Digital Vision Program Fellow at Stanford, 2003-2004
 Top 25 Women on the Web, 2000
 Upside Magazine 100 Digital Elite, 1999 and 2000
 Advertising Age i.20, 1999
 GLAAD Interactive Media Award for Internet Leadership, 1999
 Charging Buffalo Award, 2015
 Matrix Hall of Fame, 2015
Business Insider 23 Most Powerful LGBTQ+ People in Tech, 2019

Personal life
Smith married technology columnist Kara Swisher in Marin County in 1999 (before same-sex marriage was legal in California). They have two sons, Louis and Alexander, and are divorced .

References

Further reading

External links

 Official biography at Office of Science and Technology Policy 
 Profile of Megan Smith, U.S. Chief Technology Officer  - Makers: Women Who Make America

1964 births
Apple Inc. employees
Women chief technology officers
Google people
American LGBT businesspeople
LGBT people from New York (state)
Living people
MIT School of Engineering alumni
Office of Science and Technology Policy officials
Businesspeople from Buffalo, New York
American women chief executives
American chief technology officers
LGBT appointed officials in the United States
Place of birth missing (living people)